The Serbian Billie Jean King Cup team represents Serbia in Billie Jean King Cup tennis competition and are governed by the Tennis Federation of Serbia. They will compete in 2019 Fed Cup Europe/Africa Zone Group I at Venue 1 in Bath, United Kingdom. From 5 June 2006 team is playing under the name of Serbia.

Team reached the 2012 final after beating Belgium and Russia in away ties and lost to Czech Republic in Prague in their first Fed Cup final.

The Olympic Committee of Serbia declared Fed Cup team for the best female team of the year 2012.

Current team

The following players were called up for the Fed Cup Europe/Africa Zone Group I in February 2019.

Recent call-ups

The following players were part of a team in the last few years.

*Special ranking
WTA rankings as of 4 February 2019

History

Before 1992

Serbia, together with other former Yugoslavian countries, competed in its first Fed Cup in 1969, as Yugoslavian Fed Cup team until 1992. Yugoslavia reached the semifinals in 1984, with 1977 French Open champion, Mima Jaušovec and Sabrina Goleš in the team.

From 1995

Together with, what is now Montenegro Fed Cup team, Serbia competed under name of Yugoslavia from 1995 until 2003; and from 2004–2006 under name of Serbia and Montenegro. After Montenegro declared its independence, Serbia is competing under its present name since 2007.

The biggest success from 1995 is when Serbia Fed Cup team reached the final in 2012 Fed Cup World Group, where they lost to Czech Republic in away tie.

Serbia considers as the direct successor of Fed Cup team Serbia and Montenegro, FR Yugoslavia and SFR Yugoslavia.

Results

Match-ups since 2007 under present name Serbia

Former teams

1993: UN sport sanctions
1994: UN sport sanctions
1995: Dragana Zarić – Katarina Dašković – Dragana Ilić – Branislava Ivanović
1996: Dragana Zarić – Sandra Naćuk – Branislava Ivanović
1997: Dragana Zarić – Sandra Naćuk – Dragana Ilić – Ljiljana Nanušević
1998: Sandra Naćuk – Dragana Zarić – Tatjana Ječmenica – Sanja Jukić
1999: Dragana Zarić – Branka Bojović – Borka Majstorović
2000: Katarina Mišić – Marina Petrović – Dragana Zarić – Renata Ljukovčan
2001: Sandra Naćuk – Dragana Zarić – Katarina Mišić – Jelena Janković
2002: Dragana Zarić – Katarina Mišić – Jelena Janković – Daniela Berček
2003: Jelena Janković – Dragana Zarić – Katarina Mišić – Ana Jovanović (DNP)
2004: Jelena Dokic – Jelena Janković – Ana Timotić – Dragana Zarić
2005: Jelena Janković – Ana Timotić – Dragana Zarić – Ana Jovanović
2006: Ana Ivanovic – Ana Timotić – Danica Krstajić – Ana Veselinović (DNP)
2007: Jelena Janković – Vojislava Lukić – Ana Timotić – Ana Jovanović – Nataša Zorić (DNP)
2008: Jelena Janković – Ana Ivanovic – Jelena Janković – Ana Jovanović – Teodora Mirčić
2009: Jelena Janković – Ana Ivanovic – Ana Jovanović – Aleksandra Krunić – Bojana Jovanovski (DNP)
2010: Jelena Janković – Ana Ivanovic – Bojana Jovanovski – Ana Jovanović (DNP) – Aleksandra Krunić (DNP)
2011: Jelena Janković – Ana Ivanovic – Bojana Jovanovski – Aleksandra Krunić – Ana Jovanović – Tamara Čurović (DNP)
2012: Jelena Janković – Ana Ivanovic – Bojana Jovanovski – Aleksandra Krunić – Natalija Kostić (DNP)
2013: Ana Ivanovic – Bojana Jovanovski – Vesna Dolonc – Aleksandra Krunić – Ivana Jorović (DNP)
2014: Ana Ivanovic – Bojana Jovanovski – Vesna Dolonc – Jovana Jakšić – Aleksandra Krunić (DNP) – Nina Stojanović
2015: Ana Ivanovic – Jelena Janković (DNP) – Aleksandra Krunić – Ivana Jorović – Doroteja Erić (DNP) – Vojislava Lukić (DNP)
2016: Jelena Janković – Bojana Jovanovski (DNP) – Aleksandra Krunić – Jovana Jakšić – Ivana Jorović – Nina Stojanović
2017: Aleksandra Krunić – Nina Stojanović – Ivana Jorović – Dejana Radanović – Bojana Marinković – Olga Danilović (INJ)
2018: Dejana Radanović – Olga Danilović – Bojana Marinković – Ivana Jorović (INJ)

Captains

Lea Habunek, 1968—1981
Jelena Genčić, 1981—1994
Dragan Ćirić, 1995—1997
Biljana Veselinović, 1997—2004
Tatjana Ječmenica, 2005—2007
Dejan Vraneš, 2007—2014
Tatjana Ječmenica, 2014—2020
Dušan Vemić, 2020—

See also
 Fed Cup
 Serbia Davis Cup team
 Serbia ATP Cup team

References

External links

Billie Jean King Cup teams
Fed Cup
Fed Cup